The 2010 Stanley Cup Finals was the championship series of the National Hockey League's (NHL) 2009–10 season, and the culmination of the 2010 Stanley Cup playoffs. It was contested between the Western Conference champion Chicago Blackhawks and the Eastern Conference champion Philadelphia Flyers. It was Chicago's eleventh appearance in the Finals and their first since , a loss to the Pittsburgh Penguins. It was Philadelphia's eighth appearance in the Finals and their first since , a loss to the Detroit Red Wings. Chicago defeated Philadelphia four games to two to win their fourth Stanley Cup in franchise history, and their first since , ending the longest active Stanley Cup drought.

The Blackhawks became the fourth major Chicago sports team to win a championship since 1986, joining the 1985 Chicago Bears, the Chicago Bulls dynasty of the 1990s, and the 2005 Chicago White Sox. The 2016 Chicago Cubs would complete the cycle of all Chicago sports teams winning at least one championship in 30 years. Blackhawks captain Jonathan Toews was awarded the Conn Smythe Trophy as the Most Valuable Player of the 2010 playoffs, and was the first Blackhawks player to receive this honor. He and teammates Duncan Keith and Brent Seabrook won the Olympic gold medal with Team Canada at the 2010 Winter Olympics, adding the three players to the list of Ken Morrow and Steve Yzerman and Brendan Shanahan (both ), as well as Drew Doughty and Jeff Carter (both ), as the only players to accomplish this double in the same year. Having played for Team USA at the Olympics, Patrick Kane joined Chris Chelios and Brett Hull (both 2002) as having won both the Olympic silver medal and Stanley Cup in the same year. Jonathan Toews also became the 24th player and the seventh Canadian to become a member of the Triple Gold Club having won an Olympic gold medal, an IIHF World Championship Gold Medal, and the Stanley Cup.

Paths to the Finals
This was the third straight Finals in which the Western Conference team was an Original Six team that won the Central Division and the Eastern Conference team was an Atlantic Division team from the Commonwealth of Pennsylvania. Ironically, the Blackhawks have a storied rivalry with the Detroit Red Wings, as do the Flyers with the Pittsburgh Penguins.

The Blackhawks and Flyers had previously met in the 1971 playoffs; the Blackhawks beat the Flyers in four games.

Chicago Blackhawks

The Chicago Blackhawks finished the regular season as the Central Division champions with 112 points. This is the 14th division title in franchise history for Chicago but the first since  when it was called the Norris Division. As the second seed in the Western Conference playoffs, the Blackhawks defeated the seventh seed Nashville Predators and the third seed Vancouver Canucks in six games each, and then swept the first seed San Jose Sharks in the Western Conference Final to advance to the Final for the first time since .

Chicago's Marian Hossa is the first player in NHL history to appear in three straight Stanley Cup Finals with three teams, having previously made the Final with the Pittsburgh Penguins in 2008 and with the Detroit Red Wings in 2009. Along with Hossa, the other half of Chicago's preseason acquisition from Detroit, Tomas Kopecky, was also playing in his third straight Stanley Cup Finals.

Philadelphia Flyers

The Philadelphia Flyers earned the seventh seed in the Eastern Conference playoffs after finishing the regular season with 88 points, and winning the tiebreaker over the Montreal Canadiens, having more wins (41 to 39). The Flyers were the last team to qualify for the 2010 Stanley Cup playoffs. Their Cinderella march to the Final began on the final day of the regular season when they met the New York Rangers in a winner-take-all match-up for the final playoff spot. Philadelphia defeated their Atlantic Division rivals 2–1 in a historic shootout, the first do or die shootout for a playoff spot in NHL history.

In the first round of the playoffs, the Flyers upset the second seed New Jersey Devils, another of their division rivals, in five games. In the second round, against the sixth-seeded Boston Bruins, Philadelphia became the third NHL team to win a seven-game series after being down three games to none (the others being the 1942 Toronto Maple Leafs and the 1975 New York Islanders). In addition, in game seven of that series, the Flyers overcame a three goals to none deficit to win the game and series, 4–3.

In the Eastern Conference Final, the Flyers eliminated the Canadiens in five games to advance to the Stanley Cup Final for the first time since .

Game summaries
 Number in parenthesis represents the player's total in goals or assists to that point of the entire four rounds of the playoffs

Game one

The Chicago Blackhawks won the first game by a score of 6–5 on the strength of two goals by Troy Brouwer. Throughout the game, the two teams traded goals with neither team having a lead greater than one. The Flyers opened the scoring at 6:38 of the first period on a goal by Ville Leino that deflected off the face of Niklas Hjalmarsson. The Blackhawks responded with two quick goals, one of which was shorthanded, to take the lead. The lead would not last long, however, as the Flyers would counter with two goals of their own to re-take the lead 3–2 after the first period. Patrick Sharp scored 1:11 into the second period to tie the game once again. Both teams would trade goals once again and tie the game at five after the second period. Michael Leighton was replaced by Brian Boucher after allowing the fifth Chicago goal. In the third period, Tomas Kopecky scored what would eventually prove to be the game winner at 8:25. Antti Niemi finished the game with 27 saves on 32 shots while Leighton saved 15 out of 20 shots. Boucher stopped 11 of 12 shots faced in relief of Leighton.

Game two

The Blackhawks took game two of the best-of-seven series by a score of 2–1, thus giving them a 2–0 series lead heading into games three and four in Philadelphia. In contrast to game one, game two was a low-scoring affair with much tighter defense displayed by both teams. Neither team would score in the opening frame as the game entered the first intermission scoreless. It was not until late in the second period that Chicago managed to get the ice breaker with a goal from Marian Hossa. The Blackhawks quickly added another goal just 28 seconds later on a wrist shot by Ben Eager. The Flyers would eventually reply in the third period on a power play goal by Simon Gagne but it would not be enough. Both goaltenders were much stronger as Antti Niemi stopped 32 of 33 shots for the Blackhawks while Michael Leighton rebounded with 24 stops on 26 shots.

Game three

The Flyers won game three in overtime, 4–3, to pull within two games to one in the series. Daniel Briere opened the scoring for Philadelphia with a power play goal at 14:58 of the first period. Duncan Keith tied the game at 1–1 early in the second period, and both teams added another goal to leave the score at 2–2 entering the third period. Patrick Kane scored with 17:10 remaining in the game to give the Blackhawks their first lead, but Ville Leino responded with the tying goal 20 seconds later. In overtime, shortly after a review determined that a shot by Gagne was not a goal, Claude Giroux scored the game-winner at 5:59 of the extra period. This was the first time since 1987 that the Flyers had won a game in the Stanley Cup Final.

Game four

The Flyers evened the series at two games apiece by winning game four, 5–3. The Flyers took the lead 4:35 into the game on a Mike Richards power play goal. Matt Carle extended their lead to 2–0 at 14:48 of the first period. Sharp cut Philadelphia's lead in half with 1:28 left in the period, but Giroux restored the Flyers' two-goal advantage 51 seconds later. Following a scoreless second period, Leino gave Philadelphia a three-goal lead 6:43 into the third period. Dave Bolland (on a power play) and Brian Campbell scored later in the third to leave Chicago trailing 4–3 with 4:10 remaining. However, Jeff Carter scored an empty-net goal with 25 seconds left to clinch the Flyers' victory.

Game five

The Blackhawks took a 3–2 lead in the series with a 7–4 victory in game five. At 12:17 of the first period, Brent Seabrook scored on a power play to give Chicago the lead. Within the next six minutes, the Blackhawks tripled their advantage, adding goals by Bolland and Kris Versteeg to make the score 3–0. At the start of the second period, the Flyers again took Leighton out of the game, replacing him with Boucher. Four goals were scored in the second period—two by each team—and the Blackhawks entered the third period with a 5–2 lead. James van Riemsdyk pulled Philadelphia within two goals at 6:36 of the third. Sharp made the score 6–3 with 3:52 remaining, but Gagne answered for the Flyers 1:16 later. Thirty-one seconds after Gagne's goal, Dustin Byfuglien tallied an empty-net goal—his second goal of the game—which concluded the scoring. Flyers' alternate captain Chris Pronger was on the ice for six of Chicago's goals and was in the penalty box on the seventh. Discounting the power play goal, Pronger finished -5 on the game.

Game six

The sixth game required overtime, as the score was tied 3–3 at the end of the third period. Patrick Kane of the Chicago Blackhawks scored the Cup-winning goal at 4:06 into the overtime period, a shot in which the puck crossed the goal line and then got stuck underneath the padding in the back of the net. Several observers, including most of the players, announcers, and all the officials initially lost sight of the puck. Only Kane and Patrick Sharp started to celebrate immediately, soon followed by the rest of the Blackhawks. It was only after a video review that the goal was officially awarded.

Jonathan Toews won the Conn Smythe Trophy as playoff MVP. It was the first Cup to be won in overtime since .

Officials
Referees: Bill McCreary, Dan O'Halloran, Kelly Sutherland, Stephen Walkom
Linesmen: Greg Devorski, Steve Miller, Jean Morin, Pierre Racicot

Television
In Canada, the series was televised in English on CBC and in French on the cable network RDS. In the United States, NBC broadcast games one, two, five, and six (the Blackhawks won all four); while Versus televised games three and four (the Flyers won both games). In Europe, Viasat Sport broadcast the televised finals in Sweden, Finland, Norway, Denmark, and the Baltic States (Latvia, Lithuania, and Estonia), through five regional divisions of Viasat Sport. Its sister channel Viasat Sport East broadcast in the Russian language to the European and Eurasian countries of Russia, Belarus, Georgia, Moldova, Kazakhstan, Ukraine, Armenia, Kyrgyzstan, and Uzbekistan.

Ratings
Game one produced the best overnight rating in the United States for a game one since the 1999 Final. The 2.8 overnight rating and six share was a 12-percent increase from the first game of the 2009 Final between the Pittsburgh Penguins and Detroit Red Wings. Meanwhile, in Canada, game one was viewed by  people on CBC.

Game two of the series, on Memorial Day, earned a 4.1 rating. According to NBC, this is the highest game two since at least the 1975 Final because data prior to then is unavailable. Game two also saw a 21-percent increase over 2009's second game. In local markets game two drew a 25.1 rating and 39 share in Chicago along with an 18.5 rating and 28 share in Philadelphia.

Game three returned to cable on Versus where it received a 2.0 rating and  viewers. The broadcast peaked at  viewers at  ET. It ranked as the highest rated and most viewed program in the history of Versus. It also ranked as the highest-rated and most-viewed Stanley Cup Final game on cable television since .

Game four saw a decline of 9% from the 2009 Final between the Penguins and the Red Wings as just  viewers tuned into the game.

With the series returning to broadcast television on NBC, the ratings trend rebounded and improved over the 2009 Final ratings trend. Game five's prime time portion of the broadcast received a 3.3 final rating and averaged  viewers, an increase of 38% in the ratings and 32% in viewers over the 2009 Final. Locally, the Chicago market received a 26.0 rating while Philadelphia had a 19.7 rating. The average for the three NBC broadcasts rose to  viewers, an increase of 800,000 compared to 2009. This increase came despite going head to head with the 2010 NBA Finals.

Game six was the most-watched NHL game since game six in 1974, drawing a 4.7 rating and 8 share, up 38 percent vs. 3.4/6 for game six in 2009. The top two markets were Chicago, with a 32.8/50 and Philadelphia, 26.8/38. In Canada, game six was the most-watched all-American Stanley Cup Final game on the CBC, with 4.077 million viewers. The Final averaged 3.107 million viewers, up 44 percent from 2009.

Impact and aftermath

Blackhawks

The win was the Blackhawks first championship since . It gave the city of Chicago the distinction of being the first city to have at least a championship in each of the four major professional sports since 1985. It also vaulted Toews into the Triple Gold Club, having won the Olympic gold medal in Vancouver earlier in 2010 and an IIHF World Championship Gold medal in 2007. Toews and defencemen Duncan Keith and Brent Seabrook also became the fourth, fifth, and sixth players to win Olympic Gold and the Stanley Cup in the same year. With Chicago's win, the Toronto Maple Leafs are now the only Original Six team not to win the Stanley Cup or play in the Finals since the 1967 expansion; their most recent Finals appearance is 1967.

The day after the Blackhawks won the Stanley Cup, Chicago Mayor Richard M. Daley issued a proclamation declaring June 11 Chicago Blackhawks Day in the city of Chicago. That day, an estimated two million Chicagoans attended the Blackhawks Stanley Cup parade, more than the estimated 1.75 million who attended the parade for the Chicago White Sox's 2005 World Series championship,
and more than the rallies at Grant Park for any of the Chicago Bulls' NBA championships. The Blackhawks' celebration also overshadowed the series between the White Sox and Chicago Cubs taking place around the same time. However, White Sox manager Ozzie Guillén said that the parade the White Sox had was far bigger than the Blackhawks'. Daley presented the proclamation to the team at the celebratory parade and rally.

US President Barack Obama, a former US Senator from Illinois and Chicago resident, phoned Joel Quennville to congratulate his team and to invite them to the White House. Obama joked that he now had "bragging rights" over Vice President Joe Biden, a Flyers fan. The following year, the Blackhawks lost in the first round to the Vancouver Canucks in seven games.

Flyers
The loss by the Flyers was the sixth straight Final series they have lost, tying them with the 1933-40 Toronto Maple Leafs and the 1956-95 Detroit Red Wings for most consecutive finals lost. The following season, the Flyers got swept by the Boston Bruins in the second round 4–0.

The missing Cup-winning puck
Since the Cup-winning puck got stuck underneath the padding in the back of the net to end game six, there has been controversy and speculation as to its current whereabouts. Amid the confusion involving the video review and the subsequent celebrations, the Cup-winning puck got lost. Because it ended the Blackhawks' then-record for the longest active Cup drought, it is considered a valuable piece of sport memorabilia. So much so, a Chicago-based restaurant has offered a $50,000 reward for it, and the FBI has been called in to investigate the case.

Video and pictures taken from the game indicate that linesman Steve Miller was the first person who took the puck after the game-winning goal was scored, but he denies knowing where it eventually went. As a result of an ESPN story about the controversy on April 21, 2011, the league relieved Miller of his 2011 postseason duties for more than a week, citing that the controversy was a potential distraction during the playoffs. In reinstating Miller, the league said it is standing by him and his story. As Greg Wyshynski of Yahoo! Sports wrote, "it's also completely believable that this guy accidentally handed off hockey history to someone else in the postgame euphoria, and is unable to piece together what happened. So he's just going with the straight denial."

Controversy
Much controversy came throughout the first four games between the Blackhawks and Flyer defenceman Chris Pronger. Chicago complained that Pronger had gotten away with rough play that they felt was beyond the rules. The Blackhawks argued that even when they responded with the same actions that Pronger was being allowed to get away with, that they would instead be given a penalty. The Blackhawks set up a meeting with the NHL to make a complaint about Pronger's play. The Blackhawks felt that Chris Pronger had been allowed to get away with what they perceive to be "obstruction or interference" with Chicago coach Joel Quenneville saying "Whether it's stick use or obstruction, I think we'll keep an eye on it."." Pronger was also the target of a Chicago Tribune poster displaying him in a figure skating outfit after he had a +/- rating of -5 in game five and a -4 in the three games combined that the Blackhawks won against the Flyers.
Pronger had been noticed by the media and the NHL at the end of games one and two of the series as he picked up and left with the game puck at the conclusion of the games. When asked, Pronger replied that he had thrown the pucks in the garbage.

Team rosters

Chicago Blackhawks

Philadelphia Flyers

Stanley Cup engraving
The 2010 Stanley Cup was presented to Blackhawks captain Jonathan Toews by NHL Commissioner Gary Bettman following the Blackhawks' 4–3 overtime win over the Flyers in game six.

The following Blackhawks players and staff had their names engraved on the Stanley Cup

2009–10 Chicago Blackhawks

References

External links
2010 Stanley Cup Final NHL official site
2010 Stanley Cup Final at TSN
2010 Stanley Cup Final at ESPN

Stanley Cup Finals
 
Chicago Blackhawks games
Philadelphia Flyers games
Stanley Cup Finals
Stanley Cup Finals
Stanley Cup Finals
Stanley Cup Finals
2010s in Chicago
Ice hockey competitions in Chicago
Ice hockey competitions in Philadelphia
Stanley Cup Finals